Vitali Anatoliyovych Donika (born May 12, 1982) is a Ukrainian ice hockey player.

Donika competed at the 2006 and 2007 IIHF World Championships as a member of the Ukraine men's national ice hockey team.

References

External links

1982 births
Living people
HC Donbass players
Neftyanik Almetyevsk players
HC Sarov players
Sokil Kyiv players
Sportspeople from Kyiv
Ukrainian ice hockey forwards